Mark Raymond Beeney (born 30 December 1967) is an English football coach and former professional footballer, who is a goalkeeping coach for Premier League side Chelsea's reserve and youth teams.

As a player, he was a goalkeeper from 1986 to 2003. He played in the Premier League for Leeds United. He also played for Gillingham, Maidstone United, Aldershot, Brighton & Hove Albion, Doncaster Rovers, Dover Athletic and Sittingbourne.

Playing career
He began his career with Gillingham in 1986 and after one season he moved to Maidstone United. He remained with Maidstone until 1991 where he joined Brighton & Hove Albion. He then moved to Leeds United in 1993 and served as backup to John Lukic and then Nigel Martyn. In 2001, he joined Doncaster Rovers and then joined non-league side Dover Athletic in 2001 before retiring.

Coaching career
After his retirement he spent a little time as a player/coach at Sittingbourne before taking up the Academy Goalkeeping Coach role at Chelsea. He has worked closely with a number of young stoppers. In September 2007, when Jose Mourinho and his staff left the club, Beeney was temporarily promoted to first team goalkeeping coach and worked with Petr Čech and Carlo Cudicini until the club hired Christophe Lollichon. He now continues his work with the Reserves and Academy.

Personal life
His son Mitchell is also a professional goalkeeper.

References

External links

http://www.pitchside.net/interviews/interview.php?id=7

1967 births
People from Pembury
Living people
English footballers
Association football goalkeepers
Gillingham F.C. players
Maidstone United F.C. (1897) players
Aldershot F.C. players
Brighton & Hove Albion F.C. players
Leeds United F.C. players
Doncaster Rovers F.C. players
Dover Athletic F.C. players
Sittingbourne F.C. players
English Football League players
Premier League players
England semi-pro international footballers